Serpukhovsky Uyezd (Серпуховский уезд) was one of the subdivisions of the Moscow Governorate of the Russian Empire. It was situated in the southern part of the governorate. Its administrative centre was Serpukhov.

Demographics
At the time of the Russian Empire Census of 1897, Serpukhovsky Uyezd had a population of 112,002. Of these, 99.0% spoke Russian, 0.4% Ukrainian, 0.2% Polish, 0.1% Yiddish, 0.1% German and 0.1% English as their native language.

References

 
Uezds of Moscow Governorate
Moscow Governorate